Chuluut ("Rocky") is a sum (district) in the Arkhangai Province in central Mongolia. It is named after the Chuluut River. In 2009, its population was 3,744.

References 

Populated places in Mongolia
Districts of Arkhangai Province